Whitestarts are New World warblers in the  genus Myioborus. The English name refers to the white outer tail feathers which are a prominent feature of the members of this genus ("start" is an archaic word for "tail"). The species in this genus are also often called "redstarts".
  
The stronghold of the whitestarts is northern South America, although a few species range along the Andes as far south as north-western Argentina, while others range north through Central America and as far north as the United States, in the case of the painted whitestart. Most species are restricted to mountain forest and woodland. The ancestral Myioborus warblers, together with those in the genus  Basileuterus seem to have colonised  South America early, perhaps before it was linked to the northern continent, and these two genera provide most of the resident warbler species of that region.

Name
Whitestart is the name used for all species in this genus by the International Ornithological Congress, while the Clements checklist, and the American Ornithological Society's North and South American Classification Committeess  use "redstart". Myioborus species are not closely related to the various species called redstarts in the family Muscicapidae or to the American Redstart.

Species
The genus contains 12 species:

Descriptions
Adults have brightly coloured red, orange or yellow bellies. Many species have contrasting black, rufous or yellow caps or distinctive facial patterns, often with white or yellow  "spectacles" around the eye.

The painted whitestart, the most northern form, is larger ( long) and has a different plumage pattern, song and behaviour from the other whitestarts. It is also the only species which is  partially migratory, and it could perhaps be placed in a separate genus.

The sexes are similar, as with most resident tropical warblers, since they  pair for life, and have little need of sexual dimorphism, unlike many migratory species where the males need to reclaim territory and advertise for mates each year.

Distribution and habitat
The whitestarts are resident in mountain (including tepui) forest, woodland and shrub, where they feed on insects, sometimes as part of a mixed-species feeding flock.

References 

 Curson, Quinn and Beadle, New World Warblers  
 Stiles and Skutch,  A guide to the birds of Costa Rica  

Myioborus